The 2010 Men's Asia Pacific Floorball Championships, also known as the Asian/Oceanian Qualifying tournament for the 2010 Men's World Floorball Championships, are the seventh such championships in men's floorball. It was played from February 3 to February 7, 2010.

The tournament determined which 3 teams received a spot in the 2010 World Championships. For this qualifying tournament, a winning team would either receive a spot in Group B (AOFC 1), Group C (AOFC 3), or Group D (AOFC 2), depending on their position in preliminary stage play.

There was only a preliminary round in this tournament, and the top 3 teams at the end of the round qualified for the 2010 World Championships. No placement matches were played.

Japan came into the tournament as defending champions. The tournament was organised by the Asia Oceania Floorball Confederation (AOFC) and the International Floorball Federation (IFF).

Originally scheduled to play in the tournament, India withdrew due to financial difficulties.

All matches were played in Woodlands, Singapore.

Group E

February 3, 2010

February 4, 2010

February 5, 2010

February 6, 2010

February 7, 2010

|- style="text-align: center; background: #ffa07a;"
|align="center" colspan="3"|Asia Pacific Floorball Championships

See also
 2010 Men's World Floorball Championships Qualifying
 Asia Oceania Floorball Confederation
 List of Asia Pacific Floorball Champions

External links
 IFF - Official APAC 2010 Webpage

2010 in floorball
2010 in Singaporean sport
Floorball competitions
Floorball in Oceania
Floorball in Asia
February 2010 sports events in Asia